The NWA Southern Heavyweight Championship was a regional professional wrestling title which may have had several versions, including: 

NWA Florida Southern Heavyweight Championship, used in Championship Wrestling from Florida and NWA Florida
NWA Southern Heavyweight Championship (Georgia version), used in Georgia Championship Wrestling
AWA Southern Heavyweight Championship, used in the Continental Wrestling Association and other associations
NWA Southern Heavyweight Championship (Tennessee version), used in Southern Championship Wrestling
NWA Southern Heavyweight Championship (SAW) used in NWA Southern All-Star Wrestling

Regional professional wrestling championships